"Believe" is a 2015 song by Chaos featuring singer CeCe Peniston, released as a digital single on Treehouse Tribe Records on September 29, 2015.

Credits and personnel
 Shawn Zilka  - performer, producer
 Michael Gray  - remix
 Jon Pearn  - remix
 Alexander Johannes Van Der Meijden  - remix
 Oliver Portamento  - remix
 Alex Powell  - remix
 Rich B - remix
 Phil Marriott- remix
 Walter Suray - remix
 Chris Frater  - remix
 Ryan Stent  - remix
 Patryk Martynus  - remix
 Theresa Young  - remix
 Ed Kelly  - remix
 Brian Cua  - remix
 Drew G. Montalvo  - remix
 Odd Motto - remix
 Rich Jones  - remix
 Label Engine - distribution
 Hart Media - distribution

Track listing and format

 MD, #TTREP006 • AAC • FLAC
 "Believe (Chaos Mix)" - 4:44
 "Believe (Full Intention Vocal Mix)" - 5:48
 "Believe (Man Without A Clue Mix)" - 6:46
 "Believe (The Squatters Remix)" - 5:31
 "Believe (Rich B & Phil Marriot Remix)" - 7:19
 "Believe (Walter Suray Remix)" - 3:41
 "Believe (Reload Remix)" - 5:41

 MD, #TTREP006
 "Believe (Full Intention Vocal Mix)" - 5:48
 "Believe (Man Without A Clue Mix)" - 6:46
 "Believe (The Squatters Remix)" - 5:31
 "Believe (Chaos Mix)" - 4:44
 "Believe (Rich B & Phil Marriot Remix)" - 7:19
 "Believe (Walter Suray Remix)" - 3:41
 "Believe (Reload Remix)" - 5:41

 MD (B2R Remix)
 "Believe (B2R Remix)" - 5:48

 CD-R
 "Believe (Chaos Original Radio Mix)" - 3:30
 "Believe (Full Intention Radio Mix)" - 3:58
 "Believe (Rich B & Phil Marriot Radio Mix)" - 3:40

 MD, #TTREP007
 "Believe (Tracy Young Ferosh Vocal Mix)" - 5:46
 "Believe (Eddie Love Hate Remix)" - 3:47
 "Believe (Dirty Pop Remix)" - 6:50
 "Believe (Odd Motto Remix)" - 6:46
 "Believe (Thee Filth Remix)" - 5:16

Charts

Weekly charts

References

General

 Specific

External links 
 

2015 singles
CeCe Peniston songs
2015 songs
House music songs